Jableh Sporting Club is a Syrian professional football club based in Jableh.

Achievements
Syrian League
 Champions (4): 1987, 1988, 1989, 2000
Syrian Cup
 Winners (2): 1999, 2020–21

Current squad

External links
Official website

Fan website

Football clubs in Syria
1958 establishments in Syria
Association football clubs established in 1958
Jableh District